Mario Jurčević (born 1 June 1995) is a Slovenian professional footballer who plays as a wing-back for Osijek.

International career
Jurčević made his national team debut for Slovenia on 7 October 2020 in a friendly against San Marino.

Personal life
Jurčević is of paternal Croatian and maternal Serbian descent.

References

External links
Player profile at NZS 

1995 births
Living people
Footballers from Ljubljana
Slovenian footballers
Slovenia international footballers
Slovenian expatriate footballers
Association football fullbacks
NK Olimpija Ljubljana (2005) players
NK Radomlje players
NK Aluminij players
NK Osijek players
Slovenian PrvaLiga players
Slovenian Second League players
Croatian Football League players
Slovenian expatriate sportspeople in Croatia
Expatriate footballers in Croatia
Slovenian people of Croatian descent 
Slovenian people of Serbian descent